Árpád Sopsits (Szeged, born 2 May 1952) Béla Balázs Prize-winning (1994) theatre and film director, screenwriter.

Career 
He started his studies at the Faculty of Humanities of the University of Debrecen, Cours of Folk Culture and Library. Between 1975 and 1979 he studied directing at the Academy of Drama and Film in Buadapest the class of Károly Makk. From 1974 he worked at the Institute of Philosophy at Semmelweis University, and later as a scriptwriter for Mafilm. In 1994 he was awarded the Béla Balázs Prize.

He has worked at the Budapesti Kamaraszínház (2001–2004, 2008, 2011), the Gyulai Várszínház (2002, 2010), the Új Színház (2003), the Szabadkai Népszínház (2005), the National Theatre (2006, 2009), the Merlin Theatre (2011), the Vígszínház (2012) and at the Szekszárdi Német Színház (2013).

His theatrical works 
Number of performances registered in the Színházi Adattár; as author: 5 , as actor: 2 , as director: 19 ; as set designer: 9; as costume designer: 2.

Author 
 Sopsits: Dosztojevszkij: Bűn és bűnhődés a rácsok mögött (2001)
 Gogol-Sopsits:  Egy őrült naplója (2003)
 Brestyánszki-Sopsits: Álomlakó (2005)
 Sopsits: Fekete angyal(2008)
 Gyulay-Sopsits: Psyché (2010)
 Sopsits: Die Verwendlung (2013)

Actor 
 Brestyánszki-Sopsits: Álomlakó....Aranyarc
 Barfuss: Szüleink szexuális neurózisai, avagy Dora élettörténete....Dora apja

Director, designer 
Designer means: scenographer (s) or/and costume designer (cd)

 Sposits: Dosztojevszkij: Bűn és bűnhődés a rácsok mögött (2001) (cd)
 William Shakespeare: Falstaff (IV. Henrik) (2002)
 Ghelderode: Kószál a nagy kaszás (2002)
 Gogol-Sopsits: Egy őrült naplója (2003) (s, cd)
 Shepard: Hazug képzelet (2003)
 Büchner: A létező (2004)
 Büchner: Woyzeck (2004)
 Brestyánszki-Sopsits: Álomlakó (2005) (s)
 Szophoklész: Oidipusz király (2006)
 Szophoklész: Oidipusz Kolónoszban (2006)
 Sopsits: Fekete angyal (2008) (s, cd)
 Williams: Orpheusz alászáll (2009)
 Gyulay-Sopsits: Psyché (2010) (s)
 Barfuss: Szüleink szexuális neurózisai, avagy Dora élettörténete (2011) (s)
 Marber: Közelebb! (Closer) (2011) (s)
 Oksanen: Tisztogatás (2011)
 Esterházy Péter: Csokonai Lili – Tizenhét hattyúk (2012)
 Kafka: Die Verwandlung (2013) (s)

Filmography 

 Szabadjegy a bombatölcsérbe (1978)
 Niagara Nagykávéház (1980)
 Céllövölde (1990) 
 Video Blues (1992)
 Félelem és reszketés (1994)
 Rítus (1995)
 Derengő (1996)
 Légyfogó (1998)
 A negatív ember (1998)
 Abandoned / Torzók (2001)
 Tálentum (2001)
 Harasztÿ István (2003)
 Ritmusok (2004)
 Forgás (2005)
 Kocsmakoncert (2006)
 A hetedik kör (2008)
 A martfűi rém (2016)

Awards

Showing all 17 wins and 3 nominations

Annonay International Festival of films

Bergamo Film Meeting

Annonay International Festival of First films

Castellinaria International Festival of Young Cinema

Chicago International Film Festival

Hungarian Film Critics Awards

Hungarian Film Week

Locarno International Film Festival

Montréal World Film Festival

Parma International Music Film Festival, IT

Prix Europa

Bibliography 
 MTI Who's Who 2009. Ed. Péter Hermann. Budapest: MTI. 2008.

References 

1952 births
Hungarian film directors
Hungarian producers
Male screenwriters
Hungarian male writers
Hungarian actors
20th-century Hungarian screenwriters
Living people